Tey was the consort of Pharaoh Kheperkheprure Ay.

Tey may refer to:

 "Tey", a gender-neutral pronoun
 Tey Cindy, Malaysian model
 Great Tey, a village in Essex, England
 Josephine Tey, British mystery writer
 Kabaret TEY, a Polish cabaret
 Little Tey, a village in Essex, England
 Marks Tey, a village in Essex, England
 Tey, an alternative title for the 2012 film Today

See also 
 Tiye (disambiguation)